The Castrillo de la Reina Formation is a geological formation in Spain. It is late Barremian to early Aptian in age. It interpreted as a fluvial deposit. It primarily consists of red clay, with ribbon shaped sandstone channel fills. The rebbachisaurid dinosaur Demandasaurus occurs in the formation, alongside somphospondylan Europatitan as well as indeterminate small ornithopods, iguanodonts and spinosaurids, the earliest known stem-rhabdodontid (indeterminate) and the lizard Arcanosaurus.

Correlation

References 

Geologic formations of Spain
Lower Cretaceous Series of Europe
Cretaceous Spain
Aptian Stage
Barremian Stage
Shale formations
Sandstone formations
Alluvial deposits
Fluvial deposits
Paleontology in Spain